Marvin Bryant Ramirez (born May 20,1989) is a Colombian professional basketball player for  Team Cali. of the Division Profesional de Baloncesto Colombiano (DPB). 

Ramirez played for InderValle his rookie year in the Liga Baloncesto Profesional Colombiano. Ramirez also played basketball for the Cafeteros de Armenia, and Once Caldas de Manizales. Since 2015 Ramirez has played in the mid-Atlantic conference of the East Coast Basketball League (ECBL).

Amateur career

Ramirez played basketball in high school at James Monroe High School in Bronx, New York, and in college two season at SUNY Sullivan, 2007–09 season, New York NJCAA.

Professional career

On May 1, 2010, he signed Colombia at InderValle de Cali, Colombia for the Copa Federacion.

On January 20, 2011 he stays In Colombia and signs with Fast Break de Cali, Colombia.

On August 4, 2012 he agreed to a deal with Cafeteros de Armenia, Colombia. 

On April 25, 2013 he signs with Canerors Del Este, for the Liga Nacional de Baloncesto Profesional Dominican Republic.

On July 18, 2014 Signs with Once Caldas de Manizales, Colombia.

On April 1, 2021 Signs with Team Cali, Colombia.

References

External links 
 25 Best Colombian players of the decade
https://www.prlog.org/12865641-marvin-bryant-ramirez-planea-regresar-team-cali-para-jugar-en-la-dpb-2021.html
https://dpbcolombia.com/llego-el-dia-inicia-la-lbp-2021-1/
https://deportecafetero.com/anna-montanana-y-una-victoria-historica-para-sabios/
https://www.cronicadelquindio.com/noticias/deportes/cafeteros-debuta-hoy-ante-islanders
https://www.usbasket.com/Americans-Overseas.asp?Country=COL
https://www.lapatria.com/deportes/manizales-once-caldas-esta-listo-para-la-liga-directv-108056
https://quindionoticias.com/deportes/otros/equipo-masculino-de-baloncesto-de-armenia-brillo-en-medellin/
https://www.basketball-database.com/csgc/teams/120503#tab1
https://www.elpais.com.co/deportes/guillermo-moreno-dt-del-team-cali-el-equipo-sera-joven-y-competitivo.html
https://www.pressreader.com/colombia/el-pais-de-cali/20210428/281513639006104
https://www.lapatria.com/deportes/empiezan-las-emociones-del-baloncesto-59946
https://dxtcapital.com/baloncesto/llego-el-dia-inicia-la-lbp-2021-1/

Colombian men's basketball players
1989 births
Living people
Point  guards